In God We Trust is a 2013 a documentary about Eleanor Squillari, Bernard Madoff's secretary for twenty-five years and her search for the truth about Madoff's Ponzi scheme.

References

External links

2013 films
American documentary films
Madoff investment scandal
2010s English-language films
2010s American films